Irene Burns is an American television producer who has worked on shows such as 30 Rock and Oz.

She has been nominated for two Emmy Awards.

External links

American television producers
American women television producers
Living people
Year of birth missing (living people)
21st-century American women